Nippa is an unincorporated community in Johnson County, Kentucky, United States. Nippa is located in the ZIP Code Tabulation Area for ZIP code 41240.

References

Unincorporated communities in Johnson County, Kentucky
Unincorporated communities in Kentucky